Fabian Giger (born 18 July 1987) is a Swiss mountain bike racer.

Giger also rides on the road, finishing 3rd overall and winning the first stage of the 2017 Istrian Spring Trophy, as 2.2 event of the UCI Europe Tour.

Major results

Road
2017
3rd Overall Istrian Spring Trophy
1st Stage 1

References

1987 births
Living people
Swiss male cyclists
Cyclists at the 2015 European Games
European Games medalists in cycling
European Games bronze medalists for Switzerland
Swiss mountain bikers